Beninwende Yann Jonathan Pitroipa (born 12 April 1986) is a Burkinabé former professional footballer who played as a winger.

Since making his debut for Burkina Faso in 2006, he has featured at the 2010, 2012 and 2013 editions of the African Cup of Nations, scoring two goals in the 2013 tournament as Burkina Faso reached the final. He was also chosen the Player of the Tournament.

Club career

Freiburg
Pitroipa played for Planete Champion in his native Burkina Faso until 2004, when he moved to Germany. In 2004, he signed with Bundesliga side SC Freiburg. He scored his first goal for Freiburg in a 3–3 draw with SpVgg Greuther Fürth on 22 September 2006.  He went on to make 75 league appearances, both in the Bundesliga and 2. Bundesliga, and scored 16 goals.

Hamburger SV
In July 2008, Pitroipa moved to Hamburger SV on a free transfer. In his last season in the Bundesliga with Hamburg, he appeared in 26 games, adding two goals and six assists. After the dismissal of head coach Armin Veh in March 2011, Pitroipa voiced his unhappiness with the coaching situation. Under new manager Michael Oenning, Pitroipa was relegated to a bit-part role for the club and expressed his desire to leave Hamburg in search of regular football. Hamburg's new director of football, Frank Arnesen, formerly of Chelsea, did not help matters either, bringing in many young players in an effort to freshen up the squad and start a new era.

Pitroipa's last game for the club came on the final day of the 2010–11 Bundesliga season, coming on as a 38th-minute substitute for striker Paolo Guerrero in Hamburg's 1–1 draw with Borussia Mönchengladbach. Pitroipa made a total of 97 appearances for Hamburg, scoring six goals and adding ten assists. His exit from the club was part of a mass exodus of star names, as Frank Rost, Zé Roberto, Joris Mathijsen, Piotr Trochowski and Ruud van Nistelrooy were also shown the door.

Rennes
On 7 July 2011, Pitroipa completed his transfer to French side Rennes for £3.16 million transfer fee, well under the €5 million sum desired by Hamburg. Rennes were keen on securing the signature of the Burkina Faso international for a long time, impressed by "his pace and dribbling skills". In his first official appearance for his new club, Pitroipa scored a brace against Georgian side Metalurgi Rustavi in the first leg of their Europa League Playoff tie on 28 July 2011. Pitroipa made his Ligue 1 debut with Rennes in their league opener against newly promoted Dijon on 7 August 2011, which ended in a 5–1 victory. He helped in the build-up for the opening goal, delivering a long pass to Abdoulrazak Boukari, who then flicked it on to Víctor Montaño, who slid it in. This marked the first time in nine years that Rennes scored five goals in a Ligue 1 game. The following weekend, Pitroipa scored his first Ligue 1 goal for Rennes in their 1–1 draw with Paris Saint-Germain on 13 August 2011. His 88th-minute equalizer denied the free-spending capital club their first win of the season and ensured that his side remained undefeated from their opening two league outings.

After defeating Metalurgi Rustavi 7–2 on aggregate, Rennes were drawn against Red Star Belgrade in the Europa League Play-off.  Pitroipa started the first leg at the Stadion FK Crvena Zvezda in Serbia and continued his fine goal-scoring form, netting the equalizing goal for his side in the 41st minute. Substitute Víctor Montaño grabbed the winning goal for the visitors in the second-half, putting them in a comfortable position to advance to the group stages of the Europa League. Rennes won the second leg in convincing fashion, 4–0, to advance to the group stages.

Pitroipa beat Bakary Koné to the ball and shot past Hugo Lloris to help Rennes record a 2–1 victory over Lyon on 18 November and move up to fourth in the Ligue 1 table.  On 4 March 2012, he turned in a "Man of the Match" performance against Lorient as he scored a brilliant 25-yard strike with his left foot and then provided an assist for Youssouf Hadji, the man who set up Pitroipa's goal, to earn a 2–0 victory. After a mazy run through four Evian defenders, Pitroipa lofted the ball over onrushing goalkeeper Stephan Andersen as Rennes won 3–1 on 7 April to boost their bid for European football. In Rennes' game against Nice on 16 April, Pitroipa dribbled past Didier Digard before slotting the ball home, giving Rennes a 3–1 victory and putting them two points away from a Europa League spot. Pitroipa helped Rennes finish in sixth place on 60 points, thanks to scoring a goal in their 5–0 defeat of relegated Dijon on 20 May 2012; the result, however, was not good enough to secure European football for 2012–13 though.

Pitroipa scored his first goal of the 2012–13 Ligue 1 season on 25 August 2012, as Rennes registered their first victory of the campaign with a 3–2 defeat of Bastia, also providing the assist for Mevlüt Erdinç's strike.  He scored the winning goal for Rennes a minute from time against Troyes on 2 December, completing a comeback victory from 1–2 down to seal a 3–2 win and a third-straight Ligue 1 victory.

Antwerp
In early January 2018, Pitroipa was one of four signings to be announced by Belgian First Division A side Royal Antwerp F.C. Free agent Pitroipa signed a six-month contract.

Paris FC
Pitroipa joined Paris FC in 2018. He left in January 2021 after making a total of 69 league appearances and scoring 3 league goals.

Retirement
Pitroipa announced his retirement from playing in February 2021.

International career
Pitroipa made his debut for Burkina Faso in 2006. On 20 June 2009, he scored a 27th-minute goal against the Ivory Coast to put the score at 1–1 and a later own goal put his side into a 2–1 lead before a late fightback from the Elephants secured a 3–2 victory for Ivory Coast in the third round of CAF 2010 FIFA World Cup qualifying.

Pitroipa was part of the final squads at the 2010 Africa Cup of Nations in Angola and the 2012 edition in Equatorial Guinea.

Following his success in Ligue 1, Pitroipa was called up to the Burkina Faso squad to the 2013 African Cup of Nations. In the tournament, he scored an injury time goal against Ethiopia in their second group game, securing a 4–0 victory for his country. Burkina Faso advanced out of the group stage and into the quarter-finals of the competition where they faced Togo on 3 February, and Pitroipa scored the only goal of the game in the 105th minute to send the Stallions into the semi-finals. Pitroipa was controversially sent off in the semi-final game of the competition against Ghana, when he was booked for simulation in the 117th minute while it appeared that he had been fouled in the penalty box. The Stallions overcame his sending off and won 3–2 in the penalty shoot-out after the game had finished 1–1 after extra time, booking the country's first ever trip to the African Cup of Nations final. The red card was later overturned by the CAF executive committee after referee Slim Jedidi admitted to having made a mistake by showing the second yellow card. Burkina Faso lost in the final to Nigeria by a score of 1–0, but Pitroipa was named as the "Player of the Tournament" by CAF.

He retired from international football in December 2019.

Coaching career
In October 2008, Pitroipa established, alongside Burkina Faso international teammate Wilfried Sanou, the Kada School. The club is owned by his father Miki Jean-Baptiste Pitroipa and Sanou's mother.

Career statistics

Club

International goals
Scores and results list Burkina Faso's goal tally first, score column indicates score after each Pitroipa goal.

Honours
International
African Cup of Nations runner-up: 2013; third place: 2017

Individual
 Africa Cup of Nations Player of the Tournament: 2013
 Africa Cup of Nations Team of the Tournament: 2013

References

External links
 Jonathan Pitroipa at kicker.de 
 

Living people
1986 births
21st-century Burkinabé people
Sportspeople from Ouagadougou
Association football midfielders
Burkinabé footballers
Burkina Faso international footballers
2010 Africa Cup of Nations players
2012 Africa Cup of Nations players
2013 Africa Cup of Nations players
2015 Africa Cup of Nations players
2017 Africa Cup of Nations players
Planète Champion players
SC Freiburg players
Hamburger SV players
Stade Rennais F.C. players
Al Jazira Club players
Al-Nasr SC (Dubai) players
Royal Antwerp F.C. players
Paris FC players
Bundesliga players
2. Bundesliga players
Ligue 1 players
UAE Pro League players
Burkinabé expatriate footballers
Expatriate footballers in Germany
Expatriate footballers in France
Expatriate footballers in the United Arab Emirates
Expatriate footballers in Belgium
Burkinabé expatriate sportspeople in Germany
Burkinabé expatriate sportspeople in France
Burkinabé expatriate sportspeople in the United Arab Emirates
Burkinabé expatriate sportspeople in Belgium